Mount Root, also named Boundary Peak 165, is a mountain in Alaska and British Columbia, located on the Canada–United States border, and part of the Fairweather Range of the Saint Elias Mountains.  It is named for Elihu Root, who was one of the diplomats involved in settling the Alaska boundary dispute between the United States and Canada. It is where the Margerie Glacier is located.

The first ascent was made by Laurel Adkins, Thomas Distler, George Fisher and Walter Gove in 1977. It involved 22 pitches of ice climbing.

See also
List of Boundary Peaks of the Alaska-British Columbia/Yukon border

References

Mountains of Alaska
Three-thousanders of British Columbia
Saint Elias Mountains
Canada–United States border
International mountains of North America
Mountains of Yakutat City and Borough, Alaska